Edward Reilly may refer to:
 Edward Reilly (Prince Edward Island politician) (c. 1839–1872), journalist and politician from Prince Edward island, Canada.
 E. Albert Reilly (Edward Albert Reilly, 1868–?), New Brunswick politician
 Edward F. Reilly (1856–1890), New York politician
 Edward F. Reilly Jr. (born 1937), Kansas politician
 Edward J. Reilly (1905–1953), American politician in the state of Washington
 Edward R. Reilly (born 1949), Maryland politician

See also 
 Edward O'Reilly (disambiguation)
 Edward Riley (disambiguation)